Erythrorchis cassythoides, commonly known as the black bootlace orchid, is a leafless climbing orchid in the family Orchidaceae. It has long, dark brown to blackish stems and groups of up to thirty yellowish to greenish, sweetly scented flowers and is endemic to eastern Australia.

Description
There is a callus consisting of a hairy plate and two round ridges in the centre of the labellum.

Taxonomy and naming
The black bootlace orchid was first formally described by Richard Cunningham who sent a specimen and hand-written description to his brother Allan, giving the plant the name Dendrobium cassythoides. Allan Cunningham, in turn sent the description to John Lindley who published it in Edwards's Botanical Register. In 1986, Leslie Andrew Garay changed the name to Erythrorchis cassythoides. 

In the note to his brother, Richard Cunningham wrote that he had called the plant "Cassythoides, from the prima facie resemblance it has to the genus Cassytha, not only in its leafless character and short racemes of flowers, but in its peculiar bronze or japanned papulose stems - it may be found, that it also resembles it in its climbing propensities."

John Lindley noted "It is not a little remarkable that so highly curious a plant as this should so long have been over looked, although a native of a locality which, as Mr. Allan Cunningham remarks, has doubtless been traversed by Botanists of many countries in Europe, who have visited Port Jackson in ships of discovery since the Colony was founded in January 1788, viz., French, Spanish, German, Swedish, Russian, &c., besides many of our own countrymen."

Distribution and habitat
Erythrorchis cassythoides grows in forest on eucalypts, stumps and logs in near-coastal areas and nearby tablelands between the Blackdown Tableland in Queensland and Waterfall in the Royal National Park, New South Wales.

References

External links 

Vanilleae
Orchids of New South Wales
Orchids of Queensland
Plants described in 1836